Irkutsk Northwest Airport is an airport in Russia located 11 km northwest of Irkutsk. It is a flyaway airfield for the Irkutsk Aviation Plant, and has no parallel taxiways. It is also known as Irkutsk II airport, and occasionally serves as a diversion airport for the main Irkutsk Airport which is often fog-bound.

History
In 1932, the factory Irkutsk Aircraft Plant Stalin 125 was built here, and was expanded in 1941 during World War II.  By the 1960s it was known as Irkutsk Airframe Plant 39. and was observed by Western satellites in August 1962.  It produced the Ilyushin Il-28 Beagle, the Antonov An-12 Cub, the Yakovlev Yak-28 Brewer, and the Antonov An-24 Coke.  By the late 1970s the factory was involved in production of the MiG-23U (Flogger C) and ground attack MiG-23B (Flogger D/F), and produced components for the Tupolev Tu-22M Backfire bomber.  The factory is now known as the Irkutsk Aviation Plant.

Accidents and Incidents 
 On 6 December 1997, a Russian Air Force Antonov An-124-100 en route to Cam Ranh Air Base in Vietnam, crashed in a residential area shortly after takeoff.

References

RussianAirFields.com

Airports built in the Soviet Union
Airports in Irkutsk Oblast